This is a list of violent attacks and failed attack plots targeting Jewish institutions in the United States.

 1957 – November 11: A bomb at Temple Beth-El in Birmingham, Alabama was discovered before it exploded.
 1958 – February 9: Thirty sticks of dynamite discovered by police in suitcase at Temple Emanuel in Gastonia, North Carolina.
 1958 – March 16: An explosion caused severe damage to school wing of Temple Beth El in Miami, Florida.
 1958 – March 16: Bombing of Jewish Community Center in Nashville, Tennessee at 8:07pm, claimed by segregationists of the Confederate Union. The front of the unoccupied building was damaged by dynamite, including broken windows and the front door, but the center reopened two days after the bombing.
 1958 – April 28: Bombing of Jewish Center, a synagogue in Jacksonville, Florida.
 1958 – April 28: A suitcase containing more than 50 sticks of dynamite failed to explode at Temple Beth El in Birmingham, Alabama when overnight rain soaked the explosives.
 1958 – October 12: bombing of The Temple in Atlanta, Georgia by white supremacists.
 1958 – October 14, bomb damaged Temple Anshei Emeth, Peoria, Illinois.
 1960 – Shooting and firebombing attack on Congregation Beth Israel in Gadsden, Alabama.
 1967 – series of attacks by white separatists on Beth Israel Congregation in Jackson, Mississippi.
 1968 – series of attacks by white separatists on Congregation Beth Israel in Meridian, Mississippi.
 1969 – January 11, a bomb planted in the rear wall of Congregation Shaare Tikvah, Temple Hills, Maryland severely damaged the kitchen, social hall, and classrooms, with damages estimated at $200,000. There were no casualties or injuries, but a youth group social event had originally been scheduled for that evening.  
 1977 – Shaare Zedek Synagogue(University City, Missouri). Synagogue shooting,  1 dead, 2 seriously injured.
 1977 – An attack and hostage-taking at B'nai B'rith headquarters in Washington, D.C.
 1980 - In July, Congregation Shaare Tikvah, Temple Hills, Maryland was again the subject of an attack. Vandals broke into the building and attempted to firebomb the bima and ark, but the synagogue's alarm system alerted the Prince George's County Police, who arrived within minutes, thwarting the attack and minimizing the damage.   
 1983 - In the summer of 1983, the Beth Shalom synagogue in Bloomington, Indiana was damaged in an arson attack. Unknown assailants had started a fire at the base of the Torah ark, from which it spread to the sanctuary before being extinguished, leaving tens of thousands of dollars of damage.   The group responsible was the white supremacist group, The Covenant, the Sword, and the Arm of the Lord (CSA), which was linked to the Aryan Brotherhood and perpetrated multiple terrorist attacks across America in the early 1980s. The FBI suppressed the group following a siege of its rural Arkansas compound in the spring of 1985.   
 1991 – Crown Heights riot
 1994 – 1994 Brooklyn Bridge shooting shooting attack on a van carrying Chabad-Lubavitch students crossing the bridge as part of an identifiably Jewish convoy of 20 vehicles carrying members of the Chabad-Lubavitch movement.
 1994 – attacks on Temple Beth Israel in Eugene, Oregon by white separatists
 1999 – arson attacks on three Jewish congregations in Sacramento, California, including B'nai Israel
 1999 – Los Angeles Jewish Community Center shooting by a white supremacist
 2000 – White supremacist Richard Baumhammers shoots out windows at Congregation Beth El, Pittsburgh, and Congregation Ahavath Achim in Carnegie, Pennsylvania.
 2000 – Arson attack on Temple Beth El in Syracuse, New York. Hate crime by perpetrator who claimed Palestinian descent.
 2000 – Firebombing  of Conservative Synagogue Adath Israel of Riverdale, New York by group of Palestinian-American men.
 2002 – 2002 white supremacist terror plot
 2002 – 2002 Los Angeles International Airport shooting – attack on El Al, the airline of Israel.
2002 – Another attack on Temple Beth Israel in Eugene, Oregon by white separatists
 2003 – Molotov cocktail thrown through window at Valley Beth Shalom synagogue in Encino, California
 2005 – 2005 Los Angeles bomb plot. Failed plan by Muslims to bomb a synagogue.
 2006 – 2006 Seattle Jewish Federation shooting committed by Naveed Afzal Haq
 2009 – United States Holocaust Memorial Museum shooting
 2009 – Bronx terrorism plot to bomb the Riverdale Temple and nearby Riverdale Jewish Center
 2011 – 2011 Manhattan terrorism plot. Failed plan by Muslims to bomb a synagogue.
 2012 - Firebombing in Rutherford and Paramus, NJ. 
 2014 – Overland Park Jewish Community Center shooting by a Neo-Nazi
 2016 – 2016 Ohio restaurant machete attack. Islamist attack on a Middle Eastern restaurant displaying an Israeli flag.
 2018 – Pittsburgh synagogue shooting in Pittsburgh, Pennsylvania.
 2018 – Los Angeles synagogue attack
 2019 – Shooting at Chabad of Poway synagogue in Poway, California
 2019 – Failed plot to bomb the Temple Emanuel Synagogue in Pueblo, Colorado and poison its members. The would-be perpetrator pled guilty in 2020.
 2019 – 2019 Jersey City shooting. Shooting at a Kosher supermarket in Jersey City, New Jersey
 2019 – July 28, 2019, a member of synagogue in N. Miami Beach, FL, 68, was shot in the legs, as he was unlocking the front doors of the synagogue prior to a religious service. The suspect, Carlints St. Louis of Hallandale drove up in a black Chevrolet Impala, and shot him multiple times.
 2019 – Monsey Hanukkah stabbing. Five people were stabbed during Hanukkah festivities at the home of a rabbi (which was being used as a synagogue) in Monsey, New York.
 2020 – On May 30, 2020, synagogue in Los Angeles was vandalized with graffiti of "Free palestine".
 2021 – Attempted forced entry in Bal Harbour synagogue on February 7, 2021. Arab speaking man with package who began shouting praying in Arabic.
 2022 – Colleyville synagogue hostage crisis. Four hostages taken at a synagogue in Colleyville, Texas.

See also
 List of synagogue shootings

References